The Joseph Jenkins House is a historic house in Barnstable, Massachusetts.  This -story wood-frame house was built c. 1750 by Joseph Jenkins, and is a well-preserved reminder of West Barnstable's early history.  The house is four bays wide, with an off-center chimney and entry.  The main entry has plain trim, with a transom window and a triangular pediment.  The property was owned by the Jenkins family throughout the 19th century.

The house was listed on the National Register of Historic Places in 1987.

See also
National Register of Historic Places listings in Barnstable County, Massachusetts

References

Houses in Barnstable, Massachusetts
National Register of Historic Places in Barnstable, Massachusetts
Houses on the National Register of Historic Places in Barnstable County, Massachusetts
Federal architecture in Massachusetts